Krasny Ugolok is a settlement in Ruzayevsky District of the Republic of Mordovia, Russia.

References

Rural localities in Mordovia
Ruzayevsky District